Side Trips, Volume One is a jazz fusion album by Howard Wales and Jerry Garcia.  It was recorded live at the Matrix in San Francisco in 1970, and released on CD in October 1998.  It was released as a two-disc LP in a limited edition of 2,500 copies for Record Store Day in November 2017.

Monday night jam sessions at the Matrix
In a 1991 interview, Garcia said, "So they used to have this Monday night jam session, but Howard gradually sort of took it over. Howard's this amazing organ player — difficult person, but wonderful musician. And for some reason he liked our playing, John [Kahn] and mine. We didn't know each other, John and I. In fact we played with Howard for almost a year before we even actually started talking to each other. Really. We would just show up, plug in, and play. About half the set I'd be whispering to John, I'd be saying, 'Hey, man, what key are we in?' Howard didn't have tunings or anything, he just played. Sometimes he would do these things that were so outside that you just couldn't — unless you knew where it was going, you had no idea where to start. Sometimes they'd turn out to be just these things like four-bar blues turnarounds, relatively simple musical things, but they were so extended the way he'd play them — 'God, what is this?'"

Critical reception

On AllMusic, William Ruhlmann wrote, "Wales and Garcia are joined by bassist John Kahn and drummer Bill Vitt (both of whom would work extensively in Garcia's non-Dead aggregations) for 65 minutes of free-form playing. Occasionally, especially when Garcia is playing, it sounds like the Dead in the middle of one of its extended improvisations, except, of course, that the music never returns to a familiar tune."

Track listing
All compositions by Howard Wales.

"Free Flight" – 18:14
"Space Funk" – 13:12
"All for Life" – 24:33
"Venutian Blues" – 9:15

Personnel
Musicians
 Howard Wales – Hammond B3 organ, Fender Rhodes piano
 Jerry Garcia – guitar
 John Kahn – bass
 Bill Vitt – drums
Production
 Produced by Howard Wales and John Cutler
 CD mastering by Jeffrey Norman
 Design by Gecko Graphics
 Photo by Ron Rakow
 Logo photo by Mary Ann Mayer
 Thanks to Deborah Garcia, Herbie Herbert, Steve Parish

References

Howard Wales albums
Jerry Garcia live albums
Collaborative albums
1998 live albums
Grateful Dead Records live albums